The Prime Minister's Department (Jawi: جابتن ڤردان منتري) is a federal government ministry in Malaysia. Its objective is "determining the services of all divisions are implemented according to policy, legislation / regulations and current guidelines". It is headed by the Prime Minister of Malaysia followed by other Minister in the Prime Minister's Department. The Department consists of the Prime Minister's Office, the Deputy Prime Minister's Office and more than 50 other government agencies and entities. The Prime Minister's Department was established on July 1957. Its headquarters are in Perdana Putra, Putrajaya.

Structure
Formerly known as the General Administration, Prime Minister’s Department. The Department was organized into an Innovation and Human Resource Management Division, a Finance Division, a Development Division, an Accounts Division, a Management Services Division, an Internal Audit Division, a Corporate Communications Unit Division, an Events Management Division and a Legal Advisor Office Division. All nine (9) divisions are reporting to the Senior Deputy Secretary-General and assisted by the two Deputy Secretary-General which are Deputy Secretary-General (Financial and Development) and Deputy Secretary-General (Management).

Organisation
 Prime Minister of Malaysia
 Minister in the Prime Minister's Department
 Deputy Minister in the Prime Minister's Department
 Chief Secretary to the Government
 Senior Deputy Secretary-General
 Under the Authority of Senior Deputy Secretary-General
 Legal Advisor's Office
 Internal Audit Division
 1Malaysia Civil Servants Housing Unit
 Corporate Communication Unit
 Integrity Unit
 Deputy Secretary-General (Financial and Development)
 Project Development Division
 Account Division
 Finance Division
 Deputy Secretary-General (Management)
 Innovation and Human Resources Management Division
 Management Services Division
 Event Management Division

List of departments and agencies, statutory bodies, companies, foundations, committee, under Prime Minister's Department.

(As of 29 January 2019)

Departments and Agencies (51) 

 Prime Minister's Office of Malaysia (PMO), or Pejabat Perdana Menteri Malaysia (PPM). (Official site)
 Malaysia Civil Defence Force, or Angkatan Pertahanan Awam Malaysia (APM). (Official site)	
 National Disaster Management Agency (NADMA), or Agensi Pengurusan Bencana Negara (APBN). (Official site)
 Sabah and Sarawak Affairs Division, or Bahagian Hal Ehwal Sabah dan Sarawak.
 Legal Affairs Division, or Bahagian Hal Ehwal Undang-Undang (BHEUU). (Official site)
 Legal Aid Department, or Jabatan Bantuan Guaman (JBG). (Official site)
 Malaysia Department of Insolvency (MdI), or Jabatan Insolvensi Malaysia. (Official site)
 Ceremonial and International Conference Secretariat Division, or Bahagian Istiadat dan Urusetia Persidangan Antarabangsa (BIUPA). (Official site)	
 Cabinet, Constitution and Inter-Government Relation Division, or Bahagian Kabinet, Perlembagaan dan Perhubungan Antara Kerajaan (BKPP). (Official site)	
 Property and Land Management Division, or Bahagian Pengurusan Hartanah (BPH). (Official site)
 Research Division, or Bahagian Penyelidikan. 
 Protection Division, or Bahagian Perlindungan (UPS). (Official site)
 Judicial and Legal Training Institute, or Institut Latihan Kehakiman dan Perundangan (ILKAP). (Official site)
 National Palace, or Istana Negara. (Official site)
 Department of Federal Territory Islamic Affairs, or Jabatan Agama Wilayah Persekutuan (JAWI). (Official site)
 National Audit Department, or Jabatan Audit Negara. (Official site)
 Syariah Judiciary Department Malaysia, or Jabatan Kehakiman Syariah Malaysia (JKSM). (Official site)
 Sabah Syariah Judiciary Department Malaysia, or Jabatan Kehakiman Syariah Malaysia Negeri Sabah 
 Department of Islamic Development Malaysia, or Jabatan Kemajuan Islam Malaysia (JAKIM). (Official site)
 Department of Awqaf, Zakat and Haji, or Jabatan Wakaf, Zakat dan Haji (JAWHAR). (Official site)
 Islamic Dakwah Foundation of Malaysia, or Yayasan Dakwah Islamiah Malaysia (YADIM). (Official site)
 Malaysian Islamic Economic Development Foundation, or Yayasan Pembangunan Ekonomi Islam (YaPEIM). (Official site)
 Malaysian Awqaf Foundation, or Yayasan Waqaf Malaysia (YWM). (Official site)
 Alhijrah Media Corporation, or Perbadanan Media Alhijrah. (Official site)
 Institute of Islamic Understanding, or Institiut Kefahaman Islam Malaysia (IKIM). (Official site)
 Department of Orang Asli Development or Jabatan Kemajuan Orang Asli (JAKOA). (Official site)
 Attorney General's Chambers (AGC), or Jabatan Peguam Negara. (Official site)
 Department of Federal Territory Syariah Prosecution, orJabatan Pendakwaan Syariah Wilayah Persekutuan
 Public Service Department (PSD), or Jabatan Perkhidmatan Awam Malaysia (JPA). (Official site)
 Department of National Unity and Integration, or Jabatan Perpaduan Negara dan Integrasi Nasional (JPNIN). (Official site)
 Advisory Board, or Lembaga Penasihat (LP). (Official site)
 Federal Territory Syariah Court, or Mahkamah Syariah Wilayah Persekutuan (MSWP). (Official site)
 National Security Council, or Majlis Keselamatan Negara (MKN). (Official site)	

 Parliament of Malaysia, or Parlimen Malaysia. (Official site)	
 Chief Government Security Office (CGSO), or Pejabat Ketua Pegawai Keselamatan Kerajaan (KPKK). (Official site)
 Office of the Chief Registrar Federal Court of Malaysia, or Pejabat Ketua Pendaftar Mahkamah Persekutuan Malaysia. (Official site)	
 Federal Territory Mufti's Office, or Pejabat Mufti Wilayah Persekutuan. (Official site)	
 Office of the Keeper of the Rulers' Seal of the Conference of Rulers', or Pejabat Penyimpan Mohor Besar Raja-Raja Malaysia. (Official site)
 Office of the Former Prime Minister Secretariat Office, or Pejabat Urusetia Bekas Perdana Menteri Malaysia.
 Secretariat Office of Tun Dr. Mahathir Mohamad, or Pejabat Urusetia YAB Tun Dr. Mahathir Mohamad.
 Secretariat Office of Tun Abdullah Haji Ahmad Badawi, or Pejabat Urusetia YAB Tun Abdullah Ahmad Badawi 	
 Secretariat Office of Dato' Sri Mohd Najib bin Tun Abdul Razak, or Pejabat Urusetia YAB Dato' Sri Mohd Najib bin Tun Abdul Razak
 National Governance, Integrity and Anti-Corruption Center, or Pusat Governans, Integriti dan Anti-Rasuah Nasional (GIACC). (Official site)
 Public Complaints Bureau (PCB), or Biro Pengaduan Awam (BPA). (Official site)	
 Enforcement Agency Integrity Commission (EAIC), or Suruhanjaya Integriti Agensi Penguatkuasaan (SIAP). (Official site)
 The Malaysia Institute of Integrity, or Institut Integriti Malaysia (IIM). (Official site)
 Asian International Arbitration Centre (AIAC), or Pusat Timbang Tara Asia Serantau. (Official site)
 Malaysian Administrative Modernisation and Management Planning Unit (MAMPU), or Unit Pemodenan Tadbiran dan Perancangan Pengurusan Malaysia. (Official site)
 Implementation Coordination Unit (ICU), or Unit Penyelarasan Pelaksanaan. (Official site)	
 Federal Territories Land Executive Committee Secretariat, or Urusetia Jawatankuasa Kerja Tanah Wilayah Persekutuan (UJKT). (Official site)
 Malaysian Indian Society Transformation Unit, or Unit Transformasi Masyarakat India Malaysia (MITRA).

Statutory Bodies (13) 
 Pilgrimage Fund Board, or Lembaga Tabung Haji (LTH). (Official site)	
 Federal Territory Islamic Religious Council, or Majlis Agama Islam Wilayah Persekutuan (MAIWP). (Official site)
 Judicial Appointments Commission (JAC), or Suruhanjaya Perlantikan Kehakiman (SPK). (Official site)
 Election Commission of Malaysia (EC), or Suruhanjaya Pilihan Raya Malaysia (SPR). (Official site)
 Malaysian Anti-Corruption Commission (MACC), or Suruhanjaya Pencegahan Rasuah Malaysia (SPRM). (Official site)	
 Public Services Commission of Malaysia (PSC), or Suruhanjaya Perkhidmatan Awam Malaysia (SPA). (Official site)
 Education Service Commission Malaysia (ESC), or Suruhanjaya Perkhidmatan Pelajaran Malaysia (SPP). (Official site)
 Judicial and Legal Service Commission Malaysia, or Suruhanjaya Perkhidmatan Kehakiman dan Perundangan
 Human Rights Commission of Malaysia (HRC), or Suruhanjaya Hak Asasi Manusia Malaysia (SUHAKAM). (Official site) 
 Raja-Raja and the Yang di-Pertua-Yang di-Pertua Negeri Higher Studies Scholarship Fund Board, or Kumpulan Wang Biasiswa Pengajian Tinggi Raja-Raja dan Yang di-Pertua Yang di-Pertua Negeri. (Official site)
 Department of Security & Administration (Lembaga Pembangunan dan Keselamatan Negara). Y.Bhg Dr. Zainuddin B. Arshad (Ekonomi), Y.Bhg Ir. Dr. Abdul Rahman B. Mahmud (Pentadbiran Sumber Asli & Galian), Y.Bhg Prof. Dr. Tan Fah Kui (Perdagangan Antarabangsa), Y.Bhg Tan Sri Vincent Tan Chee Yioun (Pembangunan). (site)
 Langkawi Development Authority, or Lembaga Pembangunan Langkawi (LADA). (Official site) 
 Hindu Endowments Board State Pulau Penang, or Lembaga Wakaf Hindu Negeri Pulau Pinang

Under the Companies Act (7) 
 Khazanah Nasional Berhad (Khazanah) (Official site)
 Malaysian Industry-Government Group for High Technology (MiGHT). (Official site)	
 Petroliam Nasional Berhad (PETRONAS). (Official site)
 Permodalan Nasional Berhad (PNB). (Official site), a subsidiary of the Bumiputra Investment Foundation or Yayasan Pelaburan Bumiputra
 Perbadanan Nasional Berhad (PNS). (Official site) 
 Perbadanan Usahawan Nasional Berhad (PUNB). (Official site)

Foundations (1) 
 National Legal Aid Foundation, or Yayasan Bantuan Guaman Kebangsaan (YBGK).

Committee (2) 
 Governance, Government Procurement and Finance Committee, or Jawatankuasa Siasatan Tadbir Urus, Perolehan dan Kewangan Kerajaan
 Secretariat of Special Committee for Review of Law and Election Travel Affairs, or Sekretariat Jawatankuasa Khas Untuk Menyemak Semula Undang-undang dan Urusan Perjalanan Pilihan Raya

See also
 Minister in the Prime Minister's Department

References

External links

 Prime Minister's Department official portal

 
Federal ministries, departments and agencies of Malaysia
Ministries established in 1957
1957 establishments in Malaya
Malaysia
Malaysia
Malaysia
Malaysia
Malaysia
Malaysia
Malaysia
Malaysia
Malaysia